Highbush is an adjective for various types of berries:

 Highbush blueberries (Blueberry § Highbush)
 Highbush cranberries (Highbush cranberry)
 Smooth highbush blackberry (Rubus canadensis)

Berries